Federal Route 131, or Jalan Raja Perempuan Zainab II,  is a federal road in Kelantan, Malaysia. It is also a main route to the Universiti Sains Malaysia (USM) Kubang Kerian Campus. The Kilometre Zero of the Federal Route 131 starts at Pantai Sabak.

Features

At most sections, the Federal Route 131 was built under the JKR R5 road standard, with a speed limit of 90 km/h.

List of junctions and towns

References

Malaysian Federal Roads